Le Vega Clements House, at 1500 N. Highland Ave. in Owensboro, Kentucky, was built in 1894.  It was listed on the National Register of Historic Places in 1986.

It is a two-story, double-pile brick house, with a projecting three-story hexagonal tower.  It is Queen Anne in style.

It was deemed notable as "the finest examples of Queen Anne domestic architecture in Owensboro. The house, called Highlands by its
builder, Sylvester Monarch, is appropriately named because of its commanding position on a hill overlooking the Ohio River. The house and
yard cover an entire block."

References

National Register of Historic Places in Daviess County, Kentucky
Queen Anne architecture in Kentucky
Houses completed in 1894
Buildings and structures in Owensboro, Kentucky
Houses on the National Register of Historic Places in Kentucky
1894 establishments in Kentucky